The Yonaguni or  is a criticallyendangered Japanese breed of small horse. It is native to Yonaguni Island, in the Yaeyama Islands in south-western Japan, close to Taiwan. It is one of eight horse breeds native to Japan.

History 

In 1968 there were 210 Yonaguni horses. By the early 1980s, the number had fallen to little more than fifty. Numbers subsequently recovered slightly; 85 head were recorded in 2008. The conservation status of the breed was listed as "critical" by the FAO in 2007.

In 2003, genetic analysis using microsatellite data found the Yonaguni to be most closely related to the Miyako and Tokara smallisland breeds, and less closely related to various Mongolian horse breeds than were the Dosanko and Kiso breeds of the main islands of Japan.

Characteristics 

Like the other Japanese island breeds, the Yonaguni is small.

References 

Horse breeds
Horse breeds originating in Japan